Giovanni Parisi (2 December 1967 – 25 March 2009) was an Italian boxer, who won the gold medal in the Men's Featherweight (57 kg) category at the 1988 Summer Olympics in Seoul.

1988 Olympic results
Below is the record of Giovanni Parisi, an Italian featherweight boxer who competed at the 1988 Seoul Olympics:

 Round of 64: bye
 Round of 32: defeated Lu Chih Hsiung (Taipei) by decision, 5-0
 Round of 16: defeated Mikhail Kazaryan (Soviet Union) referee stopped contest in the second round
 Quarterfinal: defeated Ya'acov Shmuel (Israel) by decision, 5-0
 Semifinal: defeated Abdelhak Achik (Morocco) referee stopped contest in the first round
 Final: defeated Daniel Dumitrescu (Romania) by first-round knockout (won gold medal)

Professional career
A native of Vibo Valentia, Calabria, Parisi began his professional career in 1989 and won the Vacant WBO Lightweight Title by defeating Javier Altamirano in 1992. He later defeated former champion Freddie Pendleton and in 1995 challenged Mexican legend Julio César Chávez for the WBC Light Welterweight Title, losing a unanimous decision. Parisi went on to capture the WBO Light Welterweight Title and defend it successfully six times. He lost the WBO light-welterweight belt to Carlos Gonzalez in May 1998, and failed in a challenge for the welterweight title against Daniel Santos in July 2000.

He last fought in September 2006, when he lost a majority decision against Frederic Klose in Milan for the European welterweight crown.

Death
On 25 March 2009, Parisi was driving a car at Voghera, near Pavia, when it crashed head-on with a truck. Parisi died at the scene; he was 41.

References

External links 
 
 

1967 births
2009 deaths
Boxers at the 1988 Summer Olympics
Featherweight boxers
Olympic boxers of Italy
Olympic gold medalists for Italy
People from Vibo Valentia
Road incident deaths in Italy
Olympic medalists in boxing
Italian male boxers
Medalists at the 1988 Summer Olympics
Sportspeople from the Province of Vibo Valentia
20th-century Italian people